Panzer General III: Scorched Earth (2000) is a computer wargame by Mattel Interactive based on the game Panzer General 3D Assault.

Gameplay
Panzer General III: Scorched Earth is set in World War II on the Eastern Front. It shares the same engine as Panzer General 3D Assault, although the graphics are improved. It is considered by some to be the eastern Front expansion for Panzer General 3D, which only deals with the western front. The game features four campaigns for German and Russian forces from Moscow to Berlin. Due to the success of Panzer General 3D, it kept the same leader management system. The player begins the game with a pool of leaders that grows as the game progresses. Each leader specializes in a particular equipment class.

Reception

References

External links
Panzer General III: Scorched Earth at MobyGames
Review on Panzer General III: Scorched Earth

2000 video games
Computer wargames
Strategic Simulations games
Turn-based strategy video games
Video games scored by Kevin Manthei
Video games developed in the United States
Windows games
Windows-only games
World War II video games